The Dallas Symphony Chorus (DSC), is the official vocal ensemble of the Dallas Symphony Orchestra. 

For more than 45 years, the all-volunteer chorus has supported classical and pops performances with the Dallas Symphony Orchestra, as well as appearances in the greater Dallas metroplex, across the United States, and with orchestras in venues around the world.

The 200-person group is made up of diverse singers from around Dallas-Fort Worth, from college students to retirees, music educators to IT specialists and everything in between. The chorus regularly rehearses and performs at the Morton H. Meyerson Symphony Center from August-May during the symphony season. Rehearsals are typically held Monday evenings.

Internationally, the chorus has performed in Israel (1996) and South America (2003) and made its fourth European tour in 2018 with performances in Sweden, Finland and Estonia.

Founding 
The chorus traces its origin to an early 1977 meeting between Dallas Symphony Orchestra Music Director and Conductor Eduardo Mata, Managing Director Lloyd Halderman and University of Texas at Dallas Chancellor Bryce Jordan. Mata asked that a large-scale permanent vocal ensemble be created to make possible regular performances of major choral works with the orchestra.

The DSC's first performance as the official chorus of the Dallas Symphony took place under Mata's direction at the Music Hall at Fair Park on September 23, 1977 with a performance of the Mozart Mass in C minor. The chorus has since performed with more than 75 internationally distinguished conductors over the years.

Director 

The position of director for the Dallas Symphony Chorus is currently vacant after prior director, Joshua Habermann stepped down from the position in May 2022. In May of 2015, the Dallas Symphony announced a significant endowment gift establishing the Jean D. Wilson Chorus Director Chair for the permanent director position. To date there have been six permanent directors of the chorus, William Graham, Stewart Clark, Frank Sargent, Ronald Shirey, David R. Davidson, and Joshua Habermann.

Auditions 
The chorus is always looking for talented new members with the goal of maintaining a balanced membership of around 200 members. Auditions for those interested in joining are held in May or June each year. Audition requirements and dates can be found on the chorus’s website.

References

Choirs in Texas
Musical groups from Dallas
Musical groups established in 1977
1977 establishments in Texas
Texas classical music